Seamer railway station serves the village of Seamer in North Yorkshire, England. Seamer station is managed by TransPennine Express, with services being run by both Northern Trains and TransPennine Express.

The station is actually sited between the communities of Eastfield and Crossgates, about one mile from Seamer. It took the name of Seamer since there was already a Cross Gates railway station in West Yorkshire.

History
Seamer station was opened on 7 July 1845 by the York and North Midland Railway and became a junction station when a branch line to Filey was opened the following year (5 October 1846).  Its island platform configuration was chosen to make it easier for passengers to change between the two routes here rather than continuing into Scarborough to do so. A second branch line from the station (the Forge Valley Line to Pickering) was opened by the NER on 1 May 1882 - the station subsequently underwent improvements (including the construction of a second signal box and an additional passenger line & platform) in 1911 to accommodate the extra traffic.

The Forge Valley line was never particularly busy and it was an early victim of road competition, closing to passengers on 5 June 1950 (less than three years after the nationalisation of the railway system).  The track was lifted by 1953 and the additional platform and slow line here was removed soon afterwards.  The former station house on the down (eastern) side next to the level crossing (which has been pedestrian only since the late 1980s) still stands, though no longer in rail usage (now a private residence).

Facilities
The station currently only has basic facilities, such as a large shelter on the island platforms, as well as passenger information screens towards the middle of the platforms.  The station is unstaffed, but a ticket machine is provided.  Step-free access to the platform is via a foot level crossing at the north end - this is supervised from the nearby signal box.

Services

TransPennine Express
From Seamer Monday to Saturdays there are up to two trains per hour eastbound to Scarborough and westbound generally an hourly TransPennine Express service to York, with two-hourly extensions to Leeds and Manchester Piccadilly. Through trains to Liverpool Lime Street had been reduced significantly following the COVID-19 pandemic and were finally withdrawn at the December 2022 timetable change. 

On Sundays, the same service pattern applies.

Northern Trains
Northern Trains operates an hourly service to Bridlington and Hull on the Yorkshire Coast Line. From the next timetable change in December 2019, these will also do so on weekdays and Saturdays.

Until Northern Rail took over in 2004, Arriva Trains Northern did have services that stopped at Seamer, the current Blackpool to York service used to continue to Scarborough alongside TransPennine Express services. This service was usually worked by a Metro liveried Class 158 DMU, occasionally a Class 155 DMU. There was also a local service from York to Scarborough usually worked by a Pacer DMU or a Class 156.

The new TransPennine & Northern franchises (which started in April 2016) was to see service frequency and rolling stock improvements implemented on both routes - the Hull line will have an hourly frequency throughout the week (now implemented), whilst the York line will have two trains per hour on weekdays (one Northern, one TPE) and an hourly service on Sundays. The change to TPE routing took effect in 2018, but Northern's plans for a York service are currently on hold due to a shortage of rolling stock.

Route

References

Body, G. (1988), PSL Field Guides - Railways of the Eastern Region Volume 2, Patrick Stephens Ltd, Wellingborough,

External links

Railway stations in the Borough of Scarborough
DfT Category F2 stations
Former York and North Midland Railway stations
Railway stations in Great Britain opened in 1845
Railway stations served by TransPennine Express
Northern franchise railway stations
Stations on the Hull to Scarborough line
George Townsend Andrews railway stations